Zamia cremnophila is a species of plant in the family Zamiaceae. It is endemic to the state of Tabasco in Mexico, between Teapa and Tapijulapa.

References

cremnophila
Endemic flora of Mexico
Flora of Tabasco
Plants described in 1988
Endangered biota of Mexico
Endangered plants
Taxonomy articles created by Polbot